Rupela vexativa is a moth in the family Crambidae. It was described by Carl Heinrich in 1937. It is found in Guatemala.

The wingspan is about 27 mm. The wings are pure white. Adults have been recorded on wing in April.

References

Moths described in 1937
Schoenobiinae
Taxa named by Carl Heinrich